The 1911 Colorado Agricultural Aggies football team represented Colorado Agricultural College (now known as Colorado State University) in the Rocky Mountain Conference (RMC) during the 1911 college football season.  In their first season under head coach Harry W. Hughes, the Aggies compiled a 0–6 record, failed to score a point during the season, and were outscored by a total of 216 to 0.

Schedule

References

Colorado Agricultural
Colorado State Rams football seasons
Colorado Agricultural Aggies football